Daniel Ovidiu Tudor (born 1 June 1974) is a Romanian football coach and a former goalkeeper.

Whilst at Unirea Urziceni he played in the UEFA Champions League. On 20 October 2009 he memorably saved a Steven Davis penalty to help his side win 4–1 at Rangers.

Honours

FC Dinamo București
Cupa României: 2002–03

FC Fehérvár
Magyar Kupa: 2005–06

FC Unirea Urziceni
 Liga I: 2008–09

References

External links
 

1974 births
Living people
People from Teleorman County
Romanian footballers
CSM Flacăra Moreni players
FC UTA Arad players
FCV Farul Constanța players
AFC Rocar București players
FC U Craiova 1948 players
FC Unirea Urziceni players
FC Dinamo București players
Fehérvár FC players
ASC Daco-Getica București players
Liga I players
Liga II players
Nemzeti Bajnokság I players
Association football goalkeepers
Romanian expatriate footballers
Expatriate footballers in Hungary